Samšina is a municipality and village in Jičín District in the Hradec Králové Region of the Czech Republic. It has about 300 inhabitants.

Administrative parts
Villages of Betlem, Drštěkryje, Plhov and Všeliby are administrative parts of Samšina.

References

Villages in Jičín District